Guesalaga Peninsula is a small, L-shaped, low-lying shingle covered peninsula on the east side of Discovery Bay, Greenwich Island in the South Shetland Islands, Antarctica forming the northwest coast of Iquique Cove and the north side of its entrance. The Chilean Antarctic base Arturo Prat is situated on the peninsula.

Guesalaga Peninsula is named after Captain Federico Guesalaga, leader of the 1947 Chilean Antarctic Expedition in the frigate Iquique and the transport ship Angamos that established Arturo Prat Base, while Reyes Point and Reyes Spit are named after Navigation Second Sergeant Camilo who was in charge of navigation instruments in the Iquique.

Location

See also 
 Composite Antarctic Gazetteer
 List of Antarctic islands south of 60° S
 SCAR
 Territorial claims in Antarctica

Maps
 L.L. Ivanov et al. Antarctica: Livingston Island and Greenwich Island, South Shetland Islands. Scale 1:100000 topographic map. Sofia: Antarctic Place-names Commission of Bulgaria, 2005.
 L.L. Ivanov. Antarctica: Livingston Island and Greenwich, Robert, Snow and Smith Islands. Scale 1:120000 topographic map.  Troyan: Manfred Wörner Foundation, 2009.

References

External links
 SCAR Composite Antarctic Gazetteer.

Landforms of Greenwich Island
Peninsulas of the South Shetland Islands